Chromosome 1 open reading frame 38 is a protein that in humans is encoded by the C1orf38 gene. The gene is also known as ICB-1 and THEMIS2 in humans, and the orthologue in mice is BC013712. C1orf38 has been associated with cancer susceptibility.

Model organisms

Model organisms have been used in the study of C1orf38 function. A conditional knockout mouse line, called BC013712tm1a(KOMP)Wtsi was generated as part of the International Knockout Mouse Consortium program — a high-throughput mutagenesis project to generate and distribute animal models of disease to interested scientists.

Male and female animals underwent a standardized phenotypic screen to determine the effects of deletion. Twenty six tests were carried out on mutant mice and one significant abnormality was observed: chromosomal instability was detect by a micronucleus test.

References

Further reading 
 

Human proteins
Genes mutated in mice